El Príncipe may refer to one of the following articles:

Príncipe (Ceuta), a neighborhood in Ceuta, Spain
The Prince, by Niccolò Machiavelli
El Príncipe (José José album), a 1976 album by Mexican singer José José.
El Príncipe (Cosculluela album), a 2009 album by Puerto Rican singer Cosculluela.
El Príncipe (TV series)
El Príncipe, Castle del Príncipe (Havana)
The Prince (2019 film), by Chilean director Sebastián Muñoz.

El Príncipe is the nickname of a few football players:

 Enzo Francescoli
 Diego Milito